The architecture of Poland includes modern and historical monuments of architectural and historical importance.

Several important works of Western architecture, such as the Wawel Hill, the Książ and Malbork castles, cityscapes of Toruń, Zamość, and Kraków are located in the country. Some of them are UNESCO World Heritage Sites. Now Poland is developing modernist approaches in design with architects like Daniel Libeskind, Karol Żurawski, and Krzysztof Ingarden.

History

Pre-Romanesque and Romanesque architecture 

The oldest, Pre-Romanesque buildings were built in Poland after the Christianisation of the country but only few of them still exist today (palace and church complex on Ostrów Lednicki, the Rotunda of the Blessed Virgin Mary in the Wawel Castle).

The Romanesque architecture was then developed in the 12th and 13th centuries. The most significant buildings are the second cathedral in Kraków (only parts of it still exist in the current, third, gothic cathedral, e.g. the crypt), Tum Collegiate Church, Czerwińsk abbey, collegiate churches in Kruszwica and Opatów as well as St. Andrew's Church in Kraków. Smaller structures were also popular, like rotundas in Cieszyn and Strzelno.

Late Romanesque architecture is represented by the Cistercian abbeys in Jędrzejów, Koprzywnica, Sulejów and Wąchock as well as the Dominican church in Sandomierz and the ruins of Legnica castle chapel.

Gothic architecture 

The first Gothic structures in Poland were built in the 13th century in Silesia. The most important churches from this time are the cathedral in Wrocław and the Collegiate Church of the Holy Cross and St Bartholomew in the same city, as well as the St Hedwig's Chapel in the Cistercian nuns abbey in Trzebnica and the castle chapel in Racibórz. The Gothic architecture in Silesia was further developed in the 14th century in the series of parish churches in the most important cities of the region (churches of St. Mary Magdalene, St. Elizabeth, St Mary on the Sand and St Dorothea in Wrocław, St. Nicholas' Church ​in Brzeg, Saints Stanislaus and Wenceslaus Church in Świdnica, Saints Peter and Paul church in Strzegom).

The 14th century is also the heyday of the Gothic in Lesser Poland, where such structures were built like the gothic Wawel Cathedral in Kraków, the series of basilical churches in the same city (churches of St. Mary, Holy Trinity, Corpus Christi and St. Catherine) and many hall churches outside the capital city (e.g. Wiślica, Szydłów, Stopnica and Sandomierz). In the same time the Greater Poland's cathedrals in Poznań and Gniezno were also built.

Many Gothic structures were also built in Royal Prussia before and after the incorporation of the region into the Polish Crown according to the Second Peace of Thorn (1466). The most important sights are the castles of the Teutonic Order in Malbork, Gniew ​and Radzyń Chełmiński and the town halls and churches of Toruń (town hall, the churches of St. John the Baptist and St. John the Evangelist and St. James the Greater), Chełmno, Pelplin, Frombork and Gdańsk (town hall and churches of St. Mary, St. Catherine and Holy Trinity).

Late Gothic is represented by e.g. Collegium Maius of the Jagiellonian University in Krakow or the church of St. Mary in Poznań and Corpus Christi Church in Biecz.

Renaissance 

The Renaissance came to Poland as a court fashion thanks to King Sigismund, who became acquainted with this stylistics in Buda, at the court of his Hungarian uncle. Sigismund invited Italian craftsmen from Buda to Kraków, where they created the first Italian Renaissance piece in Poland, the Tomb of John I Albert in the Wawel Cathedral (between 1502 and 1506) and remodelled in the new manner the Wawel Castle. One of the masterpieces of this time is also the Sigismund's Chapel of the Wawel Cathedral.

Later, the Renaissance architecture was especially popular in the secular architecture (the cloth hall in Krakow, the town halls in Poznań, Tarnów, Sandomierz and Chełmno as well as town houses on the market squares in Zamość, Kazimierz Dolny and Lublin). In religious architecture Renaissance influences are visible in the Zamość Cathedral, in the church of St. Bartholomew and John the Baptist in Kazimierz Dolny, in the Bernardine churches of Lublin and Lviv (today Ukraine) as well as in many synagogues (e.g. the Old Synagogue in Krakow and Zamość Synagogue). Moreover, a specific group of churches, inspired by the Romanesque tradition of the region, was built in Mazovia (Płock, Pułtusk, Brochów, Brok).

The Renaissance architecture in the northern cities developed under the influence of Dutch Mannierism. The most important examples are the Great Armoury and the Green Gate in Gdańsk, as well as many town houses in Toruń and Elbląg (e.g. Jost von Kampen house in Elbląg).

Within the borders of modern Poland are also some important Renaissance buildings built in the lands of the Holy Roman Empire like the castle in Szczecin or the castle and the town hall in Brzeg, as well as the church in Żórawina.

Baroque architecture 

The early Baroque in Poland was dominated by the Roman influences (the jesuite churches in Nesvizh, Krakow and Lviv, as well as the Camaldolese Monastery in Kraków. In the second half of the 17th century the influences of the Dutch Baroque architecture were also important thanks to the Tylman van Gameren (Krasiński Palace and St. Kazimierz Church in Warsaw, St. Anne's Church in Kraków, Royal Chapel in Gdańsk).

The most important structures of the Polish late Baroque were built in the former Eastern Borderlands, like the St. George's Cathedral and the Dominican Church in Lviv (today Ukraine), the churches of St. Johns and St. Catherine in Vilnius (today Lithuania) as well as the Basilian Church and Monastery in Berezwecz (today Belarus) and the Saint Sophia Cathedral in Polotsk (today Belarus). Other key buildings of this period are the abbeys in Głogówko near Gostyń and Ląd, the Piarists Church and the Church of the Conversion of St. Paul in Krakow and the Visitationist Church in Warsaw.

The secular Baroque architecture in Poland is represented by the Ujazdów Castle, Royal Castle and Wilanów Palace in Warsaw, Palace of the Kraków Bishops in Kielce as well as Branicki Palace in Białystok. Other important structures are also the palaces in Radzyń Podlaski, Rogalin and Rydzyna.

In modern Poland there are also important examples of the Baroque architecture in Silesia, which was then a part of the Habsburg monarchy. They include i.a. the main building of the University of Wrocław, the Protestant Churches of Peace in Świdnica and Jawor and the former Protestant Holy Cross Church in Jelenia Góra as well as the churches by Kilian Ignaz Dientzenhofer: the Jesuit church in Legnica (built together with Christoph Dientzenhofer) and the St. Hedwig's church in Legnickie Pole.

Neoclassicism 

Neoclassicism dominated Polish architecture during the second half of the 18th and first third of the 19th century as a manifestation of Enlightenment rationalism. New stylistics came from France, Italy, and partly from Germany as a reflection of general admiration only for the newly discovered Greco-Roman antiquity. The most important structures from this period are the palaces On the Isle and Królikarnia in Warsaw by Domenico Merlini, the Lutheran Holy Trinity Church in the same city by Szymon Bogumił Zug and the cathedral in Vilnius (today Lithuania) by Laurynas Gucevičius.

Late neoclassicism, which was chronologically connected with the end of the Napoleonic Wars and capture of the former Duchy of Warsaw by the Russian Empire in 1815, was characterized by significant volumes of construction, large representative buildings, which set a new, large scale of squares and streets of Warsaw and other cities. The leading architect of the late neoclassicism in Poland is Italian Antonio Corazzi. His main buildings in Warsaw include Staszic Palace, the buildings on the Bank Square and the Grand Theatre. Other important architects were Piotr Aigner (the palace and the pavilions in Puławy landscape garden, St. Alexander's Church in Warsaw) and Jakub Kubicki (Belvedere Palace in Warsaw).

Style revivals 

The territory of the former Polish state remained divided between Prussia (Germany), Russia, and the Austrian (Austro-Hungarian) Empire and developed unevenly.

The architecture of Kraków and Galicia at that time was oriented towards the Viennese model. The experience of Vienna Ring Road was successfully applied in Kraków where Planty Park was created. Stylistically, it was an eclecticism dominated by Neo-Gothic (Collegium Novum of the Jagiellonian University) and Neo-Renaissance (Słowacki Theatre). Similar stylistics dominated other Polish lands. The most important examples are the Neo-Gothic churches of Józef Pius Dziekoński (Karol Scheibler's Chapel in Łódź, St. Florian's Cathedral in Warsaw, Białystok Cathedral, Radom Cathedral), Konstanty Wojciechowski (Częstochowa Cathedral), Jan Sas-Zubrzycki (St. Joseph's Church in Krakow) and Teodor Talowski (Church of Sts. Olha and Elizabeth in Lviv, Church of St. Mary in Ternopil) as well as Neo-Renaissance buildings of the Warsaw Polytechnic (1889-1901) and Bristol Hotel in the same city (1900, Władysław Marconi).

Karl Friedrich Schinkel designed in German Neo-Gothic stylistics St. Martin's Church in Krzeszowice and Kórnik Castle, while the Neo-Romanesque architecture is represented by the Imperial Castle in Poznań by Franz Schwechten. Other German architects were activ in at the time Prussian Silesia, e.g. Friedrich August Stüler (Royal Palace of Wrocław, St. Barbara's Church in Gliwice), Alexis Langer (St. Mary's Church in Katowice, St. Michael Archangel's Church in Wrocław) or Ludwig Schneider.

In the era of capitalism, many factory owners' villas and palaces are built, as well as numerous workers' housing estates and industrial buildings.

Art Nouveau and Folk Architecture 

Art Nouveau emerged as an attempt to abandon stylization and eclecticism, invent a new architectural style that would meet the spirit of the time. The most important centre of this style was Galicia, where many buildings were built under the influence of the Vienna Secession. The most important architects were Franciszek Mączyński in Krakow (Palace of Art, House Under the Globe, Basilica of the Sacred Heart of Jesus) and Władysław Sadłowski in Lviv (Lviv railway station, Lviv's Philharmonic, Industrial School). Moreover, some architects direct from Vienna were active in Bielsko-Biała, like Leopold Bauer (Saint Nicholas' Cathedral, house at 51 Stojałowskiego Street) and Max Fabiani (house at 1 Barlickiego Street).

Other important examples include so-called Frog House in Bielsko-Biała and - in Congress Poland - also the Poznanski's Mausoleum in Łódź, as well as early-modernist Eagles House in Warsaw.

Polish architects from the 1890s were also discovering folk motives. The leading figure of this trend was Stanisław Witkiewicz, the founder of the Zakopane Style. Folk-inspired were also many World War I Eastern Front cemeteries in Galicia, many of them designed by Dušan Jurkovič.

Modern architecture

Interwar period 

Poland's regaining of independence marked a new era in art, where modern architecture developed on a large scale, in the beginning often combining achievements of functionalism with elements of classicism. The most important architects of this period are Adolf Szyszko-Bohusz (PKO BP Building on Wielopole Street in Krakow), Marian Lalewicz (Polish Geological Institute in Warsaw, Bank Building at 50 Nowogrodzka Street in Warsaw, PKP Polskie Linie Kolejowe headquarters in Targowa Street in Warsaw), Bohdan Pniewski (Patria guesthouse in Krynica-Zdrój, court at 127 Solidarności Avenue in Warsaw) and Wacław Krzyżanowski (AGH University of Science and Technology, Jagiellonian Library in Krakow). Other important examples include also the buildings of the Polish Parliament (Sejm) in Warsaw and the Silesian Parliament in Katowice.

Important were also influences of the Polish folk art and the Expressionist architecture, clearly visible in the works of Jan Koszczyc Witkiewicz (e.g. Warsaw School of Economics), in the Polish pavilion at International Exhibition in Paris (1925) or in the St. Roch's Church in Białystok, as well as in the house at 6 Inwalidów Square in Kraków.

Examples of Polish constructivism and international style include numerous housing complexes and modern residential houses built by architects Barbara Brukalska and Stanisław Brukalski (own house at 8 Niegolewskiego Street in Warsaw, WSM housing estate in Żoliborz, Warsaw), Bohdan Lachert (own house at 9 Katowicka Street in Warsaw), Józef Szanajca, Helena and Szymon Syrkus (WSM housing estate in Rakowiec, Warsaw) or Juliusz Żórawski (houses at 28 Puławska Street, 3 Przyjaciół Avenue and 34/36 Mickiewicza Street, Warsaw).

Construction investments took place on a larger scale in modern cities like seaport Gdynia, Katowice, and Stalowa Wola.

German modernism 
Famous examples in modern Poland also include the works of German architects in Silesia, like Hans Poelzig (office building at 38-40 Ofiar Oświęcimskich Street and the Four Domes Pavilion in Wrocław), Max Berg (Centennial Hall in Wrocław), Dominikus Böhm (St Joseph's Church, Zabrze), Erich Mendelsohn (department stores in Gliwice and Wrocław) or Hans Scharoun (the Ledigenheim at WUWA housing estate in Wrocław).

After 1945 

Reconstruction of cities and monuments after the war had a diverse character. Valuable examples of cultural restitution can be reconstructions of the old towns in Warsaw and Gdańsk. However, reconstruction of buildings in the Recovered Territories was strongly influenced by political aims of eradicating architecture perceived as German, and Prussian in particular.

After the Second World War, the avant-garde architecture was initially developed (Smyk Department Store in Warsaw, Okrąglak Department Store in Poznań), but in the years 1949-1956 it was interrupted by the socialist realist period. The best examples of the so-called Stalinist neoclassicism are the Palace of Culture and Science by Lev Rudnev and the Marszałkowska Dzielnica Mieszkaniowa housing estate in Warsaw as well as the planned city of Nowa Huta in Krakow.

After the period of the socialist realism the architects could again develop the international style. The most important sights include the Kijów Cinema and the Cracovia Hotel in Kraków, Ściana Wschodnia in Warsaw, railway stations in Warsaw (Centralna, Ochota, Śródmieście, Powiśle, Stadion, Wschodnia), Spodek in Katowice and the works of Oskar Nikolai Hansen.

The brutalist architecture is represented by the Bunkier Sztuki Gallery of Contemporary Art and the Arka Pana Church in Kraków, the Plac Grunwaldzki housing estate in Wrocław and the Superjednostka residential unit in Katowice.

After 1989 
Among the most important contemporary polish architects are the post-modernists Marek Budzyński (Warsaw University Library, the Supreme Court), Romuald Loegler (Centrum E housing estate in Kraków and the chapel in the Batowice Cemetery in the same city) and Dariusz Kozłowski (Seminary of the Salesian Society in Krakow) as well as the neo-modernists Stefan Kuryłowicz (The Focus building in Warsaw), JEMS (Agora headquarters in Warsaw), Krzysztof Ingarden (Wyspiański Pavilion in Krakow) and Zbigniew Maćków (Silver Tower Center in Wrocław).

After the creation of the Third Republic, starchitects Arata Isozaki (Manggha), Norman Foster (Metropolitan, Varso), Daniel Libeskind (Złota 44) and Helmut Jahn (Cosmopolitan Twarda 2/4) had their projects in Poland. Other foreign architects active in Poland are Rainer Mahlamäki (Museum of the History of Polish Jews), Renato Rizzi (Shakespearian Theatre in Gdańsk), Riegler Riewe Architekten (Silesian Museum) and Estudio Barozzi Veig Studio (Szczecin Philharmonic).

In 2015, Szczecin Philharmonic was awarded the European Union Prize for Contemporary Architecture.

Architecture schools in Poland

Literature and sources 
 Tadeusz Dobrowolski, Sztuka polska, Warszawa 1970.
 Tadeusz Dobrowolski, Władysław Tatarkiewicz (ed.), Historia sztuki polskiej vol. I-III, Kraków 1965.
 Marek Walczak, Piotr Krasny, Stefania Kszysztofowicz-Kozakowska, Sztuka Polski, Kraków 2006.
 Adam Miłobędzki, Zarys dziejów architektury w Polsce, Warszawa 1978.
 Zygmunt Świechowski, Sztuka polska. Romanizm, Warszawa 2005.
 Szczęsny Skibiński, Katarzyna Zalewska-Lorkiewicz, Sztuka polska. Gotyk, Warszawa 2010.
 Mieczysław Zlat, Sztuka polska. Renesans i manieryzm, Warszawa 2008.
 Zbigniew Bania [et al.], Sztuka polska. Wczesny i dojrzały barok (XVII wiek), Warszawa 2013.
 Zbigniew Bania [et al.], Sztuka polska. Późny barok, rokoko, klasycyzm (XVIII wiek), Warszawa 2016.
 Jerzy Malinowski [ed.], Sztuka polska. Sztuka XIX wieku (z uzupełnieniem o sztukę Śląska i Pomorza Zachodniego), Warszawa 2016.
 Stefania Krzysztofowicz-Kozakowska, Sztuka II RP, Olszanica 2013.
 Stefania Krzysztofowicz-Kozakowska, Sztuka w czasach PRL, Olszanica 2016.
 Stefania Krzysztofowicz-Kozakowska, Sztuka od roku 1989, Olszanica 2020.
 Anna Cymer, Architektura w Polsce 1945–1989, Warszawa 2019.

See also 

 List of Polish architects
Architecture of Warsaw
Residential architecture in Poland
List of tallest buildings in Poland
Wooden synagogues of the former Polish–Lithuanian Commonwealth
Vernacular architecture of the Carpathians
Silesian architecture
Association of Polish Architects

References

External links
	

 
Polish art
Polish culture